is a Japanese special effects director and visual effects supervisor.

Life and career 
Onoue was born in 1960 in Kagoshima, Japan. He went to high school in Saga, Kyushu, Japan, and moved to Tokyo upon entering university.<ref name=":0">{{Cite web |date=February 1, 2019 |title=『ウルトラQ』「ガラモンの逆襲」上映＆スペシャルトークイベントが開催！復刻ガラモンやセミ人間など限定アイテムの販売も!! |trans-title=Screening of Ultra Q'''s "Garamon Strikes Back" & Special Talk Event Held! We also sell limited items such as reprinted Garamon and semi-humans! |url=https://hobby.dengeki.com/news/698157/ |url-status=live |archive-url=https://web.archive.org/web/20221201012950/https://hobby.dengeki.com/news/698157/ |archive-date=November 30, 2022 |access-date=November 30, 2022 |website=Dengeki Hobby Web |publisher=Kadokawa Corporation |language=Japanese}}</ref>

When he was a student, Onoue became involved in independent films, and started working part-time at Taiko Shokai, a company that handles props for television shows. He began his career working on art in 1982's Burst City. Since then, he has been working in art and special effects departments, focusing on movies and concerts.

In 1985, he became an employee Special Effects Laboratory and became an important figure at the company after working on Jikuu Senshi Spielban and Choujinki Metalder in 1987. He made his debut as a special effects director on 1994's Blue SWAT.  Since then he has worked on many blockbusters, including: Onmyōji (2001), Samurai Commando: Mission 1549 (2005), Sinking of Japan (2006), Saiyūki (2007), Hidden Fortress: The Last Princess (2008), Oba: The Last Samurai (2011), The Floating Castle (2012), Attack on Titan (2015), Persona Non Grata (2015), Shin Godzilla (2016), Moribito: Guardian of the Spirit (2017), Idaten: Tokyo Orinpikku-banashi (2019), and Shin Ultraman (2022).

 Filmography 

 Film 

 Burst City (1982)
 Onmyōji (2001)
 Returner (2002)
 Onmyōji II (2003)
 Cutie Honey (2004)
 Nin x Nin: Ninja Hattori-kun, the Movie (2004)
 Samurai Commando: Mission 1549 (2005)
 Sinking of Japan (2006)
 Saiyūki (2007)
 Hidden Fortress: The Last Princess (2008)
 Oba: The Last Samurai (2011)
 Giant God Warrior Appears in Tokyo (2012)
 The Floating Castle (2012)
 Attack on Titan (2015)
 Persona Non Grata (2015)
 Shin Godzilla (2016)
 Moribito: Guardian of the Spirit (2017)
 Idaten: Tokyo Orinpikku-banashi (2019)
 Ultraman Taiga The Movie (2020)
 Shin Ultraman (2022) - associate director and cinematographer
 Instigator: Umeyasu Fujieda (2023) - senior VFX supervisor
 Shin Kamen Rider (2023) - associate director
 Instigator: Umeyasu Fujieda 2 (2023) - senior VFX supervisor

 Television 

 ikuu Senshi Spielban (1986-1987)
 Choujinki Metalder (1987-1988)
 Blue SWAT'' (1994-1995)

References

External links 

 
 
 Katsuro Onoue at CG Kyoto
 Katsuro Onoue at Eiga.com

Japanese film directors
Living people
1960 births
Special effects people
Visual effects supervisors
Visual effects artists
People from Kagoshima Prefecture